McGarvey is an Irish surname. Notable people with the surname include:

 Ayelish McGarvey, journalist covering the religious right
 Frank McGarvey (born 1956), Scottish football player
 John William McGarvey (1829–1911), minister and religious educator in the American Restoration Movement
 Robert N. McGarvey (1888–1952), Republican member of the U.S. House of Representatives from Pennsylvania
 Rosie Kane, née McGarvey (born 1961), Scottish politician
 Ryan McGarvey (born 1986), American blues rock singer, guitarist, and songwriter
 Scott McGarvey (born 1963), Scottish football player
 Seamus McGarvey (born 1967), Northern Ireland film director
 Stan McGarvey, American football coach
 William Henry McGarvey (1843–1914), Canadian oil magnate in Europe

See also
 McGarvie, another surname